Josune Bereziartu (born January 19, 1972), also known as Josune Bereciartu Urruzola, is a Basque rock climber. For a decade starting in the late 1990s, she was considered the strongest female sport climber in the world and is regarded as one of the most important female rock climbers in history.  

In 2005, Bereziartu almost completely closed the gap with the strongest male climbers by climbing to grade  when the world's hardest climb was at 9a+/9b.

Early life
Josune Bereziartu was born on January 19, 1972, in Lazkao, a Basque town of the province of Gipuzkoa, northern Spain. Josune was first inspired to climb after watching a Spanish TV show documenting two girls climbing in the Verdon Gorge, and started climbing at 17.

Climbing career

In 1998, Bereziartu came to international attention with her repeat of Honky Tonky at Oñate, which made her the first-ever female in history to climb an  route.  In 1999, she consolidated this achievement by repeating 8c routes White Zombie and Ras at Baltzola.  In 2000, Bereziartu set a new record by becoming the first-ever female in history to climb  when she redpointed Honky Tonk Mix at Oñate. In October 2002, she set another record by becoming the world's first-ever female climber to climb a  route, when she redpointed Fred Nicole's  in St Loup, Switzerland.  In 2004, she climbed Logical Progression in Japan, another  route that was only freed a few years earlier by Dai Koyamada.  In May 2005, she set a further record, becoming the first-ever female to climb  when she redpointed Bimbaluna in  St Loup, in Switzerland; at that time, no male climber had broken the  grade barrier, and it would be another three years until Chris Sharma would climb Jumbo Love, the world's first consenus 9b route.

Bereziartu also set new records for onsight ascents. In 2000, she made the first-ever female onsight of an  route in history when she climbed Bon Vintage at Terradets in Spain.  In 2002 she made the first-ever female onsight of an  route in history when she climbed Steroid Performance at Horai in Japan.  Finally, in 2006, she made the first-ever female onsight of an  route in history when she climbed Hidrofobia in Montsant, Spain.   

Bereziartu was a keen bouldering climber, in which she also set several records.  In 2001, she became the second-ever female to solve an  problem, with Berezi, and in 2002, became the second-ever female to solve an  problem with Solaris.  In 2002, she became the first-ever female to complete an  boulder traverse, when she solved La traversia De Balzola, at Balzola in Spain.  In 2004, she pushed the female record further by completing the  boulder traverse, E la nave va, Lindental, at Lindental in Switzerland.

Bereziartu has also followed the path of earlier female sport climbers like Lynn Hill and Catherine Destivelle, freeing old aid climbing routes into major new multi-pitch traditional climbing routes in the mountains, such as Yeah Man (8b+, 300m, 9 pitches, with Rikar Otegui) in 2002, and El Pilar del Cantabrico (8a+, 500m, 13 pitches, with ) in 2004, and Super Weissmuller (8a+, 300m, 8 pitches, with Rikar Otegui) in 2007. In March 2008, Bereziartu and Otegui created a new seven-pitch alpine route on the north face of Peña Telera, called Frenesi (ED+ M7 R, 450m, 7 pitches),  while in late 2008 they were climbing hard mixed ice routes in Banff, such as Nemesis (VI WI6), and Phyllis Diller (M11).  

Bereziartu participated in few climbing competitions which reduced her sponsorship profile, preferring instead the feel of real rock, and the challenge of bringing female sport climbing to the highest grades. In 2001, she told PlanetMountain when asked about the state of female sport climbing: "What can I say about that? It looks as if women are only present in competitions. It's obvious that this isn't the case but there are so few women climbing hard outside". Talking about her choices in a 2021 Climbing interview, she said: "Looking at my career with the perspective of age, I’ve learned that it’s important to maintain your freedom and to follow the things that excite you—not what others expect you to do".

Legacy

In 2003, Climbing awarded her the Golden Piton Award for the sport climbing category (and an honorable mention in the 2004 bouldering category), calling her "hands down, the world’s top female redpoint climber, with numerous extreme bouldering endurance tests to her credit". In 2005, she was named one of National Geographic'''s Adventurers of the Year, for her ascent of Bimbaluna. In 2006, she was awarded one of the very first Arco Rock Legends awards (known as the Oscars of climbing), the Salewa Rock Award, for her contribution to sport climbing. In 2007, reporting on her freeing of multi-pitch alpine routes, Alpinist said: "This climb serves as yet another testament to Bereziartu's prowess; since the late 90s, Bereziartu has worked to push the limits of female climbing in various disciplines".

In 2008, Climbing called her "the strongest female rock climber in the world". National Geographic noted that at the height of her career in the early to mid-2000s, "She was also climbing two or three grades harder than any other woman". A 2017 Climbing magazine review of the history of women's climbing noted that "In the late 1990s and early 2000s, the Basque Josune Bereziartu became the world’s best female sport climber", and that she had "dramatically narrowed the gap between men and women".  In 2021, PlanetMountain, ranked Bereziartu as one of the most important female climbers in history, saying: "In short, from 1998 to 2005 Bereziartu's hegemony on rock was absolute. With these redpoints, and with her first female 8b+ onsight completed in 2006, Bereziartu reduced the gender gap on multiple occasions, inspiring thousands of other climbers. In addition to these physical achievements, it is worth dwelling on how they were carried achieved: always with absolute modesty, always with a smile".

Personal life
Bereziartu was not always a full-time professional climber, and during the week, Bereziartu sold insurance and investments for a Spanish insurance company, Mapfre in the early 2000s. In addition, Bereziartu designed resin holds to sell for indoor climbing walls.

 Notable ascents 

 Redpointed routes 

9a/9a+ (5.14d/5.15a):
 Bimbaluna – Saint Loup (SUI) – May 1, 2005; world's first-ever female ascent of a 9a/9a+ route.

:
 Logical Progression – Jo Yama (JPN) – November 22, 2004; world's second-ever female ascent of a 9a route.
  – Saint Loup (SUI) – October 29, 2002; world's first-ever female ascent of a 9a route.

:
 Powerade – Vadiello (ESP) – May 21, 2007; world's fourth-ever female ascent of an 8c+ route.
 Na Nai – Baltzola (ESP) – June 18, 2003; world's third-ever female ascent of an 8c+ route.
 Noia – Andonno (ITA) – October 18, 2001, world's second-ever female ascent of an 8c+ route.
 Honky Tonk Mix – Onate (ESP) – 2000, world's first-ever female ascent of an 8c+ route.

:
 Ras at Baltzola – Baltoza (ESP) – 1999, world's third-ever female ascent of an 8c route.
 White Zombie – Baltoza (ESP) – 1999, world's second-ever female ascent of an 8c route.
 Honky Tonky – Onate (ESP) – 1998, world's first-ever female ascent of an 8c route.

 Onsighted routes 

:
 Hidrofobia – Montsant (ESP) – April 18, 2006; world's first-ever female onsight of an 8b+ route.

:
 Fuente de energia – Valdiello – November, 2005;  world's third-ever female onsight of an 8b route.
 La Réserve – St Léger (FRA) – October 1, 2005;  world's second-ever female onsight of an 8b route.
 Steroid Performa – Japan – December 28, 2004; world's first-ever female onsight of an 8b route.

:
 Bon Vintage – Terradets – Valdiello – 2000; world's first-ever female onsight of an 8a+ route.

 Boulder problems 

:
 E la Nave va – Lindental (SUI) – May 10, 2003 - Traverse; world's first-ever female ascent of 8C boulder traverse.

:
 Travesia De Balzola – Baltzola (ESP) – April 6, 2002 - Traverse world's first-ever female ascent of an 8B+ boulder traverse.

:
 Solaris – Baltzola (ESP) – April 15, 2003; only the second-ever female ascent of an 8A+ boulder problem after  ascended Liaison Futile in 1999.

:
 Berezi – Larraona (ESP) – 2000. Only the second-ever female ascent of an 8A boulder problem after  ascended Duel in 1998.

 Multi-pitch routes 
 El Castillo de los Sacristanes , 400-metres, 10 pitches – Ordesa Park (ESP) – 2009 – First free ascent with Rikar Otegui.
 Zaratustra , 400-metres, 10 pitches – Ordesa Park (ESP) – 2008 – Fully free ascent with Rikar Otegui.
 El Ojo Critico – , 400-metres, 10 pitches – Ordesa Park (ESP) – July 6, 2007 – First free ascent with Rikar Otegui.
 Super Weissmuller , 300-metres, 8 pitches – Petit Pic De Ansabere (FRA) – June 2007 – First free ascent with Rikar Otegui.
 Divina Comedia  A2, 275-metres, 11 pitches – Ordesa Park (ESP) – July 2006 – First free ascent with Rikar Otegui.
 Yeah man , 300-metres, 9 pitches – Grand Pfad (SUI) – July 1, 2004 – First free ascent with Rikar Otegui.

Mixed ice routes
 Firenze (ED+ M7 R), 450m, 7 pitches – Peña Telera (North Face) (ESP) – March 2008 – First free ascent with  Rikar Otegui.

Awards
 Arco Rock Legends, Salewa Rock Award, 2006.
 National Geographic, Adventurers of the Year, 2005.
 Climbing Magazine, Golden Piton Award (Sport Climbing), March 2003.

Filmography
 Documentary on Bereziartu: 
 Documentary on climbing in Naranjo de Bulnes: 

 See also 
List of grade milestones in rock climbing
History of rock climbing
Catherine Destivelle, one of the greatest female sport climbers of the 1980s
Lynn Hill, one of the greatest female sport climbers of the 1980s and early 1990s

References

External links
 

 INTERVIEW: In your face: Josune Bereziartu Climbing Magazine'' (1 May 2000, Issue 194, page 54) 

1972 births
Living people
People from Goierri
Basque women
Sportspeople from Gipuzkoa
Female climbers
Spanish rock climbers
Spanish mountain climbers
Boulder climbers